Herbert Joseph Sweet (October 8, 1919 – June 18, 1998) was a United States Marine who served as the 4th Sergeant Major of the Marine Corps. He fought and was wounded in World War II and the Korean War.

Early life
Herbert Sweet was born on October 8, 1919, in Hartford, Connecticut, and the following year moved to Troy, New York, where he grew up and received his schooling. As a child, Sweet made his home with his uncle, Harold J. Nash.

Military career
Sweet enlisted in the United States Marine Corps on February 26, 1937. Following recruit training at Marine Corps Recruit Depot Parris Island, he saw duty with Marine detachments at Quantico, Virginia, the 1939 World's Fair in New York City, and in Trinidad.

Throughout World War II, Sweet served with the 21st Marine Regiment and the 3rd Marine Division, moving with the unit to New Zealand and Guadalcanal for training. He saw combat at the Battle of Bougainville, where he served as a platoon sergeant and was promoted to gunnery sergeant. He was wounded in action during the landing on Guam in July 1944 and, following hospitalization, rejoined the 21st Marines for the Battle of Iwo Jima. There, he earned the Bronze Star Medal with valor device for exposing himself to enemy fire in order to rescue his wounded company commander, two other Marines and a corpsman. He was wounded and evacuated twice.

He also served two separate tours at Marine Corps Base Camp Lejeune, first as an infantry chief, and following the Korean War, as regimental sergeant major of the 2nd Marine Regiment and field sergeant major of the 2nd Marine Division, respectively. He requested duty in Korea on the outbreak of hostilities there, and in 1951 saw combat as rifle company first sergeant with the 5th Marine Regiment. He was wounded in action that October and earned the Navy Commendation Medal with valor device.

Sweet returned from Korea in July 1952, and served thereafter as assistant to the professor of naval science, NROTC Unit at Columbia University in New York City for two years. Following his second tour of duty at Camp Lejeune, he was stationed in the Philippine Islands as barracks sergeant major, Subic Bay, from 1958 to 1960. Then he served as sergeant major of the 6th Marine Corps Reserve and Recruitment District at Atlanta, Georgia. In July 1964 he was named sergeant major for 3rd Marine Division (Fleet Marine Force in the Far East). While serving in this capacity, he was selected as the 4th Sergeant Major of the Marine Corps by a board convened in Washington and assumed his new post on July 16, 1965.

Later life

Sweet died June 18, 1998, of respiratory failure at his home in Alexandria, Virginia. He was buried with full military honors at Arlington National Cemetery.

Awards and decorations
Sweet's military decorations include:

References

External links
Official Marine Corps biography

1919 births
1998 deaths
Sergeants Major of the Marine Corps
United States Marine Corps personnel of World War II
United States Marine Corps personnel of the Korean War
Deaths from respiratory failure
Burials at Arlington National Cemetery
Military personnel from Hartford, Connecticut
Military personnel from Troy, New York